Penns Neck or Penn's Neck may refer to:

 Penns Neck, New Jersey, an unincorporated community in Mercer County, New Jersey
 Penns Neck Baptist Church

 Penns Neck (cape), a cape on the Delaware River in Salem County, New Jersey
 Penn's Neck Township, New Jersey, former township in Salem County, New Jersey
 Lower Penns Neck, New Jersey, now Pennsville Township
 Upper Penns Neck, New Jersey, now Carneys Point Township

See also
 Churchtown, New Jersey, also known as Penns Neck, Salem County, New Jersey